Four Lakes can refer to:
Four Lakes (Idaho)
A group of lakes in southern Wisconsin
Lake Kegonsa
Lake Mendota
Lake Monona
Lake Waubesa
Four Lakes, Washington
Battle of Four Lakes